Moore is an electoral district of the Legislative Assembly in the Australian state of Western Australia.

Moore has had three incarnations as an electorate. In its first incarnation, Moore was one of the original 30 seats contested at the 1890 colonial election.

Its latest incarnation it has existed continuously since 1950. In that time, the seat has been variously held by the two conservative forces in Western Australian politics: the Liberal Party and the National Party. The seat has never been won by the Labor Party.

Geography
Moore is a coastal district, covering an expanse of rural territory to the north of Perth and surrounding but not including the regional city of Geraldton. The district includes the towns of Kalbarri, Northampton, Nabawa, Mullewa, Dongara, Irwin, Mingenew, Morawa, Three Springs, Perenjori, Carnamah, Eneabba, Leeman, Coorow, Jurien Bay, Cervantes, Badgingarra, Dandaragan, Moora, Dalwallinu, Lancelin, Ledge Point, Guilderton, Gingin, Bindoon, Calingiri and Toodyay.

History
Electoral reform ahead of the 2008 state election necessitated an increase in the enrolment of non-metropolitan districts. This meant that the district of Greenough was abolished, with Moore taking in most of its former territory and voters. This pitted the National member for Greenough, Grant Woodhams, against the Liberal member for Moore, Gary Snook, with Woodhams emerging the victor.

Moore's most famous member was Henry Lefroy, Premier of Western Australia from 1917 to 1919.

Members for Moore

Election results

References

External links
 ABC election profiles: 2005 2008
 WAEC district maps: current boundaries, previous distributions

Moore
1890 establishments in Australia
Constituencies established in 1890